Elie Cristo-Loveanu (27 July 1893 – 28 April 1964) was a Romanian artist. His work was part of the art competition at the 1932 Summer Olympics.

References

1893 births
1964 deaths
Romanian artists
Olympic competitors in art competitions
People from Turnu Măgurele